The 2023 Nigerian presidential election in Adamawa State will be held on 25 February 2023 as part of the nationwide 2023 Nigerian presidential election to elect the president and vice president of Nigeria. Other federal elections, including elections to the House of Representatives and the Senate, will also be held on the same date while state elections will be held two weeks afterward on 11 March.

Background
Adamawa State is a large, diverse northeastern state in the process of recovering from the worst of the Boko Haram insurgency. The state also has to contend with an underdeveloped yet vital agricultural sector and low education rates along with continued security challenges from Boko Haram and ISWAP to sustained conflict between herders and farmers.

Politically, the 2019 Adamawa elections were a swing back to the PDP as its presidential nominee Atiku Abubakar won the state back from Buhari and Ahmadu Umaru Fintiri unseated APC Governor Bindo Jibrilla. Legislatively the PDP also gained ground, winning two Senate seats, five House of Representatives seats, and control of the House of Assembly.

Polling

Projections

General election

Results

By senatorial district 
The results of the election by senatorial district.

By federal constituency
The results of the election by federal constituency.

By local government area 
The results of the election by local government area.

See also 
 2023 Adamawa State elections
 2023 Nigerian presidential election

Notes

References 

Adamawa State gubernatorial election
2023 Adamawa State elections
Adamawa